Haplogroup CT is a human Y chromosome haplogroup, defining one of the major paternal lineages of humanity.

Men who carry the CT clade have Y chromosomes with the SNP mutation M168, along with P9.1 and M294. These mutations are present in all modern human male lineages except A and B-M60, which are both found almost exclusively in Africa.

The most recent common male line ancestor (TMRCA) of all CT men today probably predated the recent African origin of modern humans, a migration in which some of his descendants participated. He is therefore thought to have lived in Africa before this proposed migration. In keeping with the concept of "Y-chromosomal Adam" given to the patrilineal ancestor of all living humans, CT-M168 has therefore also been referred to in popularized accounts as being the lineage of "Eurasian Adam" or "Out of Africa Adam"; because, along with many African Y-lineages, all non-African Y-lineages descend from it.

No male in paragroup CT* has ever been discovered in modern populations. This means that all males carrying this haplogroup are also defined as being in one of the several major branch clades. All known surviving descendant lineages of CT are in one of two major subclades, CF and DE. In turn, DE is divided into a predominantly Asia-distributed haplogroup D-CTS3946 and a predominantly Africa-distributed haplogroup E-M96, while CF is divided into an East Asian, Native American, and Oceanian haplogroup C-M130 and haplogroup F-M89, which dominates most non-African populations.

Subclades
Haplogroup CT (M168/PF1416)
CF (P143/PF2587, CTS3818/M3690/PF2668, CTS6376/M3711/PF2697) Shan people
C (M130/Page51/RPS4Y711, M216)  Asia, Oceania, and North America
 C1  F3393/Z1426
 C1a CTS11043
 C1a1 formerly C1 (M8, M105, M131)  Japan
 C1a2 Very low frequency in Western Eurasia (including Kostenki 38 000 years ago)
 C1b
 C1b1
C1b1a
C1b1a1 formerly C5 (M356)  South Asia, Central Asia, and Southwest Asia
 C1b2
C1b2a formerly C2 (M38)  Indonesia, New Guinea, Melanesia, Micronesia, and Polynesia
C1b2b formerly C4 (M347)  Indigenous Australians
C2 formerly C3 (M217, P44) Found throughout Eurasia and North America, but especially among Mongols, Kazakhs, Tungusic peoples, Paleosiberians, and Na-Dené-speaking peoples
F (M89, M213) Found throughout Eurasia, Oceania, and the Americas
F1 (P91, P104)
F2 (M427, M428)
F3 (P96)
F4 (M481)
GHIJK F1329/M3658/PF2622/YSC0001299, CTS2254/M3680/PF2657, FGC2045/Z12203 Throughout Eurasia; also The Americas; at low levels/among minorities in Africa and Oceania
G  M201, P257 Primarily the Caucasus; also at low levels/among minorities in Europe, North Africa, South West Asia and Central Asia
HIJK Throughout Eurasia; also The Americas; at low levels/among minorities in Africa and Oceania
H  M69, M370  South Asia, Central Asia, and Southwest Asia
IJK  L15/S137, L16/S138  Eurasia, North Africa, Oceania, the Americas and East Africa
IJ    M429/P125  Europe, Western Asia, North Africa and East Africa
I     M170, M258, P19, P38, P212, U179  Europe
J     12f2.1, M304  Europe, Western Asia, South Asia, North Africa and East Africa
K     M9 Found all over Eurasia; also significant in the Americas and Oceania; at lower levels in North Africa and East Africa
LT (K1) L298/P326
L     M11, M20, M22, M61, M185, M295  the Indian subcontinent
T     M70, M184/USP9Y+3178, M193, M272   (formerly K2)  Southwestern Asia, South Asia, North Africa, the Horn of Africa, the Chad Basin, and Southern Europe
K2 M526 Eurasia, Oceania, The Americas, some indigenous Australians and some minorities in Africa
NO (K2a) M214 Reportedly found in small numbers of Buyi and Japanese males.
N     M231  Eastern Europe, North Asia, and East Asia
O     M175  Oceania, Southeast Asia, and East Asia
K2b formerly MPS P331 Eurasia, The Americas, Oceania and minorities in Africa
K2b1 formerly MS P397/P399 Melanesians, Micronesians, indigenous Australians and Polynesians.
M P256 Eastern Indonesia, Papua New Guinea, and Melanesia
S M230, P202, P204   (formerly K5) Eastern Indonesia, Papua New Guinea, and Melanesia
P (K2b2) 92R7, M45, M74/N12, P27.1/P207 Throughout Eurasia, The Americas and some minorities in Africa
Q M242  The Americas and Eurasia
R M207/UTY2, M306/S1 Europe, Near East, South Asia, Chad Basin, Canary Islands
 K2c P261 Low levels in Bali
 K2d P402/P403 Low levels in Java
 K2e M147 Low levels in South Asia
Haplogroup DE (M1/YAP, M145/P205, M203/Page36, P144, P153, P165, P167, P183) Asia, Africa, Southern and Eastern Europe; also at low levels in Oceania
Haplogroup D (M174) Primarily Japan, Tibet and Andaman Islanders; also at low level/among minorities in East Asia, Central Asia, Micronesia and Melanesia
Haplogroup D1 (CTS11577) Mainly Tibet; minorities in Central Asia, East Asia, and South East Asia
 Haplogroup D1a Z27276 East and Central Asia
D1a1 (M15) (ex-D1) Qiang people; also at low levels throughout East and Central Asia
 Haplogroup D1a2 P99 (ex-D3) Tibet and Central Asia
 Haplogroup D1b (ex-D2) (M64.1/Page44.1, M55, M57, M179/Page31, M359.1/P41.1, P37.1, P190, 12f2.2) Mainly Japan; also at lowel levels/among minorities in Korea, China, Micronesia and Melanesia
Haplogroup D2 L1366 (ex-D1a) Philippines
Haplogroup E (M40, M96)  Africa, Middle East, Southern and Eastern Europe
Haplogroup E1 (P147) At high levels throughout Africa; at lower levels in the Middle East and Europe
Haplogroup E1a (formerly E1) (M132) Primarily Africa
Haplogroup E1b (P177/PF1939)
Haplogroup E1b1 (formerly E3) (P2, DYS391p)
Haplogroup E1b1a (V38)
Haplogroup E1b1a1 (formerly E3a) (M2)  West Africa, Central Africa, Southeast Africa and Southern Africa
Haplogroup E1b1b (formerly E3b) (M215)  Horn of Africa (Ethiopians, Somalis), North Africa (Berbers, Arabs), the Middle East, Europe (esp. areas near the Mediterranean Sea)
Haplogroup E2 (M75) East Africa

Sources
 ISOGG:
 Y-DNA Haplogroup Tree 2015
 Y-DNA Haplogroup C and its Subclades - 2015
 Y-DNA Haplogroup F and its Subclades - 2015

See also

Genetics

Human Y-chromosome DNA haplogroup
Y-chromosome haplogroups in populations of the world
Y-DNA haplogroups by ethnic group
Y-DNA haplogroups in populations of East and Southeast Asia
Y-DNA haplogroups in populations of Oceania

Y-DNA C subclades

References

CT